ABC's Wide World of Sports is an American sports anthology television program that aired on ABC from April 29, 1961 to January 3, 1998, primarily on Saturday afternoons. Hosted by Jim McKay, with a succession of co-hosts beginning in 1987, the title continued to be used for general sports programs on the network until 2006. In 2007, Wide World of Sports was named by Time on its list of the 100 best television programs of all time.

Weekend sports news updates on sister radio network ABC Sports Radio, operated by Cumulus Media Networks, continue to be branded under the similar title ABC's World of Sports. The program also lent its name to an athletic facility at Walt Disney World, the ESPN Wide World of Sports Complex, which was originally known as Disney's Wide World of Sports Complex from its opening in 1997 (one year after The Walt Disney Company acquired ABC and an 80% stake in ESPN) until 2010.

History

Origins
Wide World of Sports was the creation of Edgar Scherick through his company, Sports Programs, Inc. After selling his company to ABC, he hired a young Roone Arledge to produce the show.

The series' April 29, 1961 debut telecast featured both the Penn and Drake Relays. Jim McKay (who hosted the program for most of its history) and Jesse Abramson, the track and field writer for the New York Herald Tribune, broadcast from Franklin Field with Bob Richards as the field reporter. Jim Simpson called the action from Drake Stadium with Bill Flemming working the field.

During its initial season in the spring and summer of 1961, Wide World of Sports was initially broadcast from 5 p.m. to 7 p.m. Eastern Time on Saturdays. Beginning in 1962, it was pushed to 5 to 6:30 pm, and later to 4:30 to 6 pm. Eastern Time to allow ABC affiliates in the Eastern and Central Time Zones to carry local early-evening newscasts.

Successful spin-offs
In 1961, Wide World of Sports covered a bowling event in which Roy Lown beat Pat Patterson. The broadcast was so successful that in 1962, ABC Sports began covering the Professional Bowlers Tour.

In 1964, Wide World of Sports covered the Oklahoma Rattlesnake Hunt championships; the following year, ABC premiered outdoor program The American Sportsman, which remained on the network for nearly 20 years.

In 1973, the Superstars was first televised as a segment on Wide World of Sports; the following year, the Superstars debuted as a weekly winter series that lasted for 10 years.

Athlete of the Year
In 1963, ABC Sports producers began selecting the Athlete of the Year. Its first winner was track and field star Jim Beatty for being the first to run a sub-4-minute mile indoors. Through the years, this award was won by such now legendary athletes of Muhammad Ali, Jim Ryun, Lance Armstrong, Mario Andretti, Dennis Conner, Wayne Gretzky, Carl Lewis and Tiger Woods. The award was discontinued in 2001.

The end of Wide World of Sports
In later years, with the rise of cable television offering more outlets for sports programming, Wide World of Sports lost many of the events that had been staples of the program for many years (many, although not all, of them ended up on ESPN, a sister network to ABC for most of its existence). Ultimately, on January 3, 1998, Jim McKay announced that Wide World of Sports, in its traditional anthology series, had been canceled after a 37-year run. The Wide World of Sports name remained in use afterward as an umbrella title for ABC's weekend sports programming.

In August 2006, ABC Sports came under the oversight of ESPN, under the relaunched banner name ESPN on ABC. The Wide World of Sports title continues to occasionally be revived for Saturday afternoon sports programming on ABC; it was used during the 140th Belmont Stakes as a tribute to Jim McKay following his death in June 2008, and in 2017 it was used for the revival of the Battle of the Network Stars. Most of ABC's sports programming since Wide World of Sports ended as a program has been displaced from ABC and moved to ESPN; the cable network began producing its own anthology series on Saturday afternoons in 2010, ESPN Sports Saturday, which consists of documentaries originally featured on ESPN's E:60 and 30 for 30 programs, and a modified version of the ESPN interactive series SportsNation, titled Winners Bracket.

Format

Sports featured on Wide World of Sports

Wide World of Sports was intended to be a fill-in show for a single summer season, until the start of fall sports seasons, but became unexpectedly popular. The goal of the program was to showcase sports from around the globe that were seldom, if ever, broadcast on American television. It originally ran for two hours on Saturday afternoons, but was later reduced to 90 minutes.

Usually, Wide World featured two or three events per show. These included many types not previously seen on American television, such as hurling, rodeo, curling, jai-alai, firefighter's competitions, wrist wrestling, powerlifting, surfing, logger sports, demolition derby, slow pitch softball, barrel jumping, and badminton. NASCAR Grand National/Winston Cup racing was a Wide World of Sports staple until the late 1980s, when it became a regularly scheduled sporting event on the network. Traditional Olympic sports such as figure skating, skiing, gymnastics and track and field competitions were also regular features of the show. Another memorable regular feature in the 1960s and 1970s was Mexican cliff diving. The lone national television broadcast of the Continental Football League was a Wide World of Sports broadcast of the 1966 championship game; ABC paid the league $500 for a rights fee, a minuscule sum by professional football standards.

Firsts
Wide World of Sports was the first U.S. television program to air coverage of – among events – Wimbledon (1961), the Indianapolis 500 (highlights starting in 1961; a longer-form version in 1965), the NCAA Men's Basketball Championship (1962), the Daytona 500 (1962), the U.S. Figure Skating Championships (1962), the first color broadcast of the Monaco Grand Prix (1967), the Little League World Series (1961), The British Open Golf Tournament (1961), the X-Games (1995) and the Grey Cup (1962).

Introduction
The program's introductory sequence was accompanied by a stirring, brassy musical fanfare (composed by Charles Fox), set over a montage of sports clips and accompanying narration written by Stanley Ralph Ross and voiced by McKay:

"The thrill of victory ... and the agony of defeat"
The melodramatic introduction became a national catchphrase that is often heard to this day. While "the thrill of victory" had several symbols over the decades, ski jumper Vinko Bogataj, whose dreadful misjump and crash during a competition on March 21, 1970 was featured from the early 1970s onward heard over the sentence "...and the agony of defeat", became a hard-luck hero of sorts, and an affectionate icon for stunning failure. Previously, the footage played with that phrase was that of another ski jumper who made a long, almost successful jump, but whose skis lost vertical alignment shortly before landing, leading to a crash.

Later in the 1990s, an additional clip was added to the "agony of defeat" sequence after Bogataj's accident: footage of a crash by Alessandro Zampedri, Roberto Guerrero and Eliseo Salazar during the 1996 Indianapolis 500 showed a car flipping up into the catch fence. The "oh no!" commentary that accompanies it, however, is dubbed from commentary by Benny Parsons of Steve Grissom's crash in the 1997 Primestar 500 (part of the NASCAR Winston Cup series). Bogataj's mishap is also commemorated in Rich Hall's book Sniglets as "agonosis", which is defined as "the syndrome of tuning in on Wide World of Sports every weekend just to watch the skier rack himself."

Announcers

Hosts
 Jim McKay (1961–1998)
 Becky Dixon (1987–1988)
 Frank Gifford (1987–1993)
 Julie Moran (1994–1995)
 John Saunders (1995–1996)
 Robin Roberts (1996–1998)

Event announcers

Play-by-play

 Tim Brant
 Howard Cosell
 Becky Dixon
 Chris Economaki
 Bill Flemming
 Terry Gannon
 Frank Gifford
 Curt Gowdy
 Keith Jackson
 Jim Lampley
 Jim McKay
 Al Michaels
 Julie Moran
 Brent Musburger
 Paul Page
 Bud Palmer
 Jerry Punch
 Robin Roberts
 John Saunders
 Chris Schenkel
 Al Trautwig
 Steve Zabriskie

Reporters

 Chris Economaki
 Bill Flemming
 Keith Jackson
 Jim Lampley
 David Letterman
 Stirling Moss
 Sam Posey
 Jerry Punch
 Jody Scheckter
 O. J. Simpson
 Lynn Swann
 Al Trautwig
 Lesley Visser
 Rodger Ward
 John Watson
 Jack Whitaker

Analysts

 Donnie Allison
 Chris Economaki
 Phil Hill
 Ned Jarrett
 Fred Lorenzen
 Mickey Mantle
 Cheryl Miller
 Don Meredith
 Stirling Moss
 Sam Posey
 Bill Russell
 Jackie Stewart
 Rodger Ward

International versions

Canada
From September 19, 1964 until the late 1980s, a Canadian version was aired by the CTV Television Network. Licensed by ABC, the CTV broadcast included a mix of content from the American show, and segments produced by CTV and its affiliates.

Australia
In Australia, the Nine Network produced its own version from 1981 to 1999 and from 2008 to 2016, Nine's Wide World of Sports, which has since become the all-encompassing brand for all of Nine's sport coverage. It was also originally a sports anthology series, but also featured professional sporting competitions. It, along with Nine's cricket coverage, also inspired a series of parodies, released as audio albums by Billy Birmingham, under the nom-de-plum of The Twelfth Man.

Mexico
A program partly inspired by the U.S. version, known as DeporTV, El Ancho Mundo del Deporte (DeporTV, the Wide World of Sports) debuted on Canal 13, at the time the Mexican government's public television channel (which later became Imevisión) on January 6, 1974. The program continues to air on Imevisión's successor TV Azteca, becoming one of the longest-running programs in the country. It was hosted by José Ramón Fernández from its inception until 2006, and is currently hosted by Antonio Rosique, Luis García Postigo and Christian Martinolli. The program "El Ancho Mundo del Deporte" was aired in Monterrey Mexico in the state government owned Canal 28 from 1985 to 1991. This was possible in an exchange with Imevisión since the NFL national broadcast in Mexico for that national network was originated in Monterrey (Fernando Von Rossum Garza and Jose "Pepe" Espinoza). The hosts in the Monterrey version of "El Ancho Mundo del Deporte" were Javier Hector Gutierrez, Rubén Pizarro, Alejandro Campos, Martha Vigil and Carlos Gutierrez.

United Kingdom
The United Kingdom's ITV network produced its own Saturday afternoon Wide World of Sports in 1965, but within six weeks renamed it to World of Sport, which ran until 1985.

See also
List of longest-running United States television series

References

External links

Jump The Shark – Wide World of Sports

1961 American television series debuts
1998 American television series endings
1960s American anthology television series
1970s American anthology television series
1980s American anthology television series
1990s American anthology television series
American Broadcasting Company original programming
ABC Sports
American sports television series
Black-and-white American television shows
Sports telecast series
Peabody Award-winning television programs